Nyíregyháza Airport  is a small civil airport serving Nyíregyháza, a city in Szabolcs-Szatmár-Bereg county, Hungary.

Facilities

The airport is the home base of Tréner Ltd, a Hungarian pilot training organization which together with the University of Nyíregyháza (responsible for theoretical training) provides ATPL integrated courses and a professional airline pilot degree.

Airlines and destinations
Between 1948 and 1963, the airport served the then-frequent domestic flights operated by Maszovlet and its successor Malév. Apart from a short-lived attempt in 1990, which tried to restart domestic flights within Hungary with a Nyíregyháza-Budaörs Airport route, there have been no scheduled flights to or from the airport since then.

Statistics

Accidents
The second of two accidents of Maszovlet took place at this airport. On 2 October 1952, an Li-2 (HA-LIL) was flying the Budapest–Miskolc–Nyíregyháza–Budapest route. Due to poor weather conditions, the landing in Miskolc succeeded only at the third attempt, yet the crew decided to continue the flight towards Nyíregyháza, where after several landing attempts the plane landed on slippery grass and crashed into a building. Three crew members, including the pilot and the co-pilot, died, two other crew members and the three passengers suffered severe injuries.

References

External links
 Official website
 

Airports in Hungary
Buildings and structures in Szabolcs-Szatmár-Bereg County